Quercetin 3-sulfate is a plasma human metabolite of quercetin. It is the sulfate conjugate of quercetin.

Quercetin-3-sulfate 3'-sulfotransferase is an enzyme that uses 3'-phosphoadenylyl sulfate and quercetin 3-sulfate to produce adenosine 3',5'-bisphosphate and quercetin 3,3'-bissulfate. Quercetin-3-sulfate 4'-sulfotransferase is an enzyme that uses 3'-phosphoadenylyl sulfate and quercetin 3-sulfate to produce adenosine 3',5'-bisphosphate and quercetin 3,4'-bissulfate. Both enzymes can be found in Flaveria chlorifolia. Quercetin-3,3'-bissulfate 7-sulfotransferase is an enzyme that uses 3'-phosphoadenylyl sulfate and quercetin 3,3'-bissulfate to produce adenosine 3',5'-bisphosphate and quercetin 3,7,3'-trissulfate. The enzyme can be found in Flaveria sp.

References 

Quercetin
Sulfate esters